A door is a panel or barrier used to cover an opening in a wall or partition.

Door or doors may also refer to:

Places
 Door County, Wisconsin, United States
 Door Creek, Wisconsin, an unincorporated community in the United States
 Door Peninsula, Wisconsin, United States
 The Dooars region of India

Arts, entertainment, and media

Music

Albums
 Door (Every Little Thing album), 2008
 Door (Fieldwork album), 2008
 Door (Junoon album), 2016
 Doors (album), by saxophonist Eric Kloss, 1972
 The Doors (album), 1967

Other uses in music
 "A Door", a song from Aaron Tippin's 1997 album, Greatest Hits… and Then Some
 "Door", a song from the album Minecraft – Volume Alpha by C418
 The Doors, a rock band

Television
 "The Door" (Game of Thrones), a 2016 episode of Game of Thrones
 Westworld: The Door, the second season of the television series Westworld

Other uses in arts, entertainment, and media
 Door, a character in the Neil Gaiman novel and television series Neverwhere
 The San Diego Door, an underground newspaper 1968–1974
 The Doors (film), about the rock band
 The Wittenburg Door, a humor and satire magazine
 DOORS, a Roblox Game made by LSPLASH

Computing
 BBS door, an interface between a bulletin board system and an external program
 Doors (computing), an interprocess communication mechanism
 IBM Rational DOORS, a requirement management tool

See also 
 
 Dooars
 Dorr (disambiguation)
 The Door (disambiguation)